Wat Ananda Metyarama Thai Buddhist Temple is a Theravada Buddhist monastery and temple in Singapore. The monastery was originally set up by Venerable Luang Phor Hong Dhammaratano with his disciple Samanera Boonler. The temple is located at 50B Jalan Bukit Merah.

Overview
Founded in the 1920s, Wat Ananda Metyarama Thai Buddhist Temple is one of the oldest Thai Theravada Buddhist temples in Singapore. Originally situated at 83 Silat Road, it was renovated in 1953 under the then-abbot Venerable Phra Rajayankavee, with further renovations as well as new construction between 1975 and 1997 under present-day abbot Venerable Chao Khun Phra Tepsiddhivides. In the 21st century, the monastery underwent a major construction exercise which concluded with a brand new building at 50B Jalan Bukit Merah in 2014.

On 5 January 2014, the new extension were officially opened by Indranee Rajah. The new building features a Dhamma hall, Meditation hall, Cultural center (museum), conference room, dining hall, rest area, Sunday classroom, and the monks' abode. The new Julamanee Prasat Theravada Columbarium was opened on 15 June 2014 at the temple.

Wat Ananda Youth Group
Wat Ananda Youth (WAY) is an organisation founded in 1966 by Venerable Phraku Bisaldhammanides. It was formerly known as the Ananda Metyarama Buddhist Youth Circle. After Bisaldhammanides left for Bangkok in 1974, WAY continued holding most of its activities in the Temple.

Dhamma Wisdom Centre
Regular events are conducted at the Dhamma Wisdom Centre at 27 Jalan Senyum.

See also
 Wat Ananda Youth
 Palelai Buddhist Temple
 Burmese Buddhist Temple
 Sri Lankaramaya Buddhist Temple
 Ti-Sarana Buddhist Association
 Vipassana Meditation Centre
 Buddhism in Singapore
 Thais in Singapore

References

News articles

External links

Buddhist temples in Singapore
Thai diaspora in Asia
Overseas Thai Buddhist temples